Loughborough is a town in Leicestershire, England.

Loughborough may also refer to:

United Kingdom
 Baron Loughborough
 Loughborough Grammar School
 Loughborough University
 Loughborough Junction
 Loughborough (UK Parliament constituency)

Other uses
 Loughborough Lake, a lake in Eastern Ontario, Canada
 Loughborough v. Blake, an 1820 U.S. Supreme Court case concerning the taxation of Washington, D.C.
 John Norton Loughborough, early Seventh-day Adventist minister